Henry Smith Reynolds (6 January 1844 – 21 April 1894) was an English first-class cricketer active 1872–76 who played for Nottinghamshire. He was born in Ollerton; died in Burnley.

References

1844 births
1894 deaths
English cricketers
Nottinghamshire cricketers
North v South cricketers
Non-international England cricketers
People from Ollerton
Cricketers from Nottinghamshire